Hymns by Johnny Cash is the third studio album and first gospel album by American singer Johnny Cash. The album was produced in 1958 and was then officially released in 1959.  An alternate version of the song It was Jesus was an added bonus track after the album was re-issued in 2002. Cash said he left Sun Records because Sam Phillips would not let him record a gospel album. Columbia promised him to release an occasional gospel album; this was a success for him to record. The album was Cash’s first and most popular gospel album, and is an example of traditional hymns set to country gospel music. The album was recorded simultaneously with The Fabulous Johnny Cash.

Critical reception
The Rolling Stone Album Guide deemed the album "fairly uninspiring." Billboard called It Was Jesus and I Saw a Man "outstanding."

Track listing

Personnel
Musicians
Johnny Cash - vocals, rhythm guitar
Luther Perkins - lead guitar
Don Helms - steel Guitar
Marshall Grant - bass
Marvin Hughes - piano
Buddy Harman - drums
Morris Palmer - drums on "Lead Me Father"
The Jordanaires - backing vocals

Additional personnel
Al Quaglieri - producer
Don Law - producer
Seth Foster - mastering
Mark Wilder - mastering, mixing
Hal Adams - photography
Don Hunstein - photography
Stacey Boyle - tape research
Matt Kelly - tape research
Kay Smith - tape research
Steven Berkowitz - A&R
Darren Salmieri - A&R
Patti Matheny - A&R
Howard Fritzson - art direction
Randall Martin - design
Nick Shaffran - consultant
Johnny Whiteside - liner notes

References

Johnny Cash albums
1959 albums
Columbia Records albums
Gospel albums by American artists